Tata Tele Business Services Limited (TTBSL), formally known as Tata Tele Services Limited (TTSL), is an Indian broadband, telecommunications and cloud service provider based in Mumbai. It is a subsidiary of the Tata Group, an Indian conglomerate. It operated fixed line services under the brand name Tata Tele Broadband  in various telecom circles of India.  
Tata Teleservices used to provide mobile services under Tata DoCoMo (GSM mobile operator, wireless broadband).

In August 2017, Tata Teleservices  sought to exit mobile network division due to large losses and debt, then sold its unit to Bharti Airtel in a debt free and cash-free deal and described as virtually free; Airtel will only pay a part of Tata Teleservices's unpaid spectrum payment liability. In November 2017, Tata Teleservices customers transitioned to the Airtel mobile network under an Intra Circle Roaming (ICR) arrangement. SIM cards and billing plans remained the same. The consumer mobile businesses of Tata Docomo, Tata Teleservices (TTSL) and Tata Teleservices Maharashtra Limited (TTML) have been merged into Bharti Airtel from 1 July 2019.

The Key Managerial Personnel (KMP) at Tata Teleservices (Maharashtra) Limited India are Kush Swatantra Bhatnagar as Cfo(Kmp), Harjit Singh as Manager and Vrushali Neelesh Dhamnaskar as Company Secretary. Narendra Damodar Jadhav, Thambiah Elango, Ramanathan Kumar and 3 other members are presently associated as directors.

History 

In February 2008, TTSL announced that it would provide CDMA mobile services targeted towards the youth, in association with the Virgin Group on a franchisee model basis.

NTT DoCoMo announced on 25 April 2014 that they would sell 100% of their shares in Tata Indicom to Tata Teleservices and exit Indian market. The company had reported a loss of $780 million during financial year ending 31 March 2014.

By 1 April 2015, all Virgin Mobile CDMA & GSM customers have been migrated into the umbrella Tata Indicom brand (Tata Indicom for Mumbai NCR).

On 9 October 2017 Tata Teleservices announced it is preparing an exit plan for most of its 5,000-odd employees, which includes a notice of three to six months, severance packages for those willing to leave earlier, a voluntary retirement scheme (VRS) for elders, while transferring only a small part of its employees to other group companies.

On 12 October 2017, Bharti Airtel announced that it would acquire the consumer mobile businesses of Tata Teleservices Ltd (TTSL) and Tata Teleservices Maharastra Ltd (TTML) in a debt-free cash-free deal. The deal will essentially be free for Airtel which will only incur TTSL's unpaid spectrum payment liability. TTSL will continue to operate its enterprise, fixed line and broadband businesses and its stake in tower company Viom Networks. The deal received approval from the Competition Commission of India (CCI) in mid-November 2017. On 29 August 2018, Bharti Airtel, got its shareholders approval for the merger proposal with Tata Teleservices.

On 17 January 2019 NCLT Delhi gave final approval merger between Tata Docomo and Airtel. Department of Telecom (DoT), and Competition Commission of India (CCI) gave green signals for merger deal between Bharti Airtel and Tata Teleservices. The consumer mobile businesses of Tata Docomo, Tata Teleservices (TTSL) and Tata Teleservices Maharashtra Limited (TTML) have been merged into Bharti Airtel from 1 July 2019.

See also

 Mobile phone companies of India
 VSNL

References

Companies based in Mumbai
Telecommunications companies of India
Tata Sons subsidiaries
Internet service providers of India
Mobile phone companies of India
Telecommunications companies established in 1996
Communications in Maharashtra
Tata Teleservices
Indian companies established in 1996
1996 establishments in Maharashtra
Companies listed on the National Stock Exchange of India
Companies listed on the Bombay Stock Exchange